The British Academy consists of world-leading scholars and researchers in the humanities and social sciences. Each year, it elects fellows to its membership. The following were elected in the 1910s.

1910
 Professor A. C. Bradley
 Professor Gilbert Murray
 Sir Sidney Lee

1911
 Professor George Saintsbury
 Professor A. E. Taylor
 Professor T. F. Tout

1912
No appointments were made in 1912.

1913
 Professor Samuel Alexander, OM
 Professor A. S. Hunt
 Sir George MacDonald, KCB
 Rev. Dr E. A. Abbott
 Sir John MacDonell, KCB
 Sir C. Hercules Read

1914
 Lord FitzMaurice
 Dr J. W. MacKail
 Viscount Haldane of Cloan, KT, OM

1915
 Principal H. Stuart Jones
 Professor D. S. Margoliouth
 Professor W. R. Scott
 Sir Charles J. Lyall, KCSI
 W. L. Newman
 Sir James H. Ramsay, Bt

1916
 Professor A. C. Clark
 Dr L. R. Farnell
 Very Rev. Sir George Adam Smith
 Professor A. A. Bevan
 Professor John Burnet

1917
 Sir George A. Grierson, OM, KCIE
 Dr G. F. Hill, CB
 Professor James Smith Reid
 Rt Rev. Bishop Ryle, KCVO

1918
 Professor R. Seymour Conway
 Professor G. E. Moore

1919
 Dr Paget Toynbee
 Sir Arthur E. Cowley

See also 
 Fellows of the British Academy

References 
The names are from the list of fellows, alive and dead, in Proceedings of the British Academy, vol. xviii (1932), pp. vii–x.